Tazeh Deh may refer to:
 Tazeh Deh, Kermanshah
 Tazeh Deh, Divandarreh, Kurdistan Province
 Tazeh Deh, Sanandaj, Kurdistan Province
 Tazeh Deh, Razavi Khorasan